Dixon County is a county in the U.S. state of Nebraska. As of the 2010 United States Census, the population was 6,000. Its county seat is Ponca. The county was created in 1856 and attached to Dakota County. It was organized in 1858.

Dixon County is part of the Sioux City, IA–NE–SD Metropolitan Statistical Area.

In the Nebraska license plate system, Dixon County is represented by the prefix 35 (it had the 35th-largest number of vehicles registered in the county when the license plate system was established in 1922).

History
Dixon County was formed in 1856. Dixon was named for an early settler.

Geography
Dixon County lies at the northeast edge of the state. Its northern boundary line abuts the southern boundary line of the state of South Dakota, across the Missouri River.

Major highways

  U.S. Highway 20
  Nebraska Highway 9
  Nebraska Highway 12
  Nebraska Highway 15
  Nebraska Highway 35
  Nebraska Highway 116

National protected area

 Missouri National Recreational River (part)

State protected area
 Buckskin Hills State Wildlife Management Area
 Ponca State Park
 Tarbox Hollow Living Prairie

Adjacent counties

 Union County, South Dakota - northeast
 Dakota County - east
 Thurston County - southeast
 Wayne County - southwest
 Cedar County - west
 Clay County, South Dakota - northwest

Demographics

As of the 2000 United States Census, there were 6,339 people, 2,413 households, and 1,705 families in the county. The population density was 13 people per square mile (5/km2). There were 2,673 housing units at an average density of 6 per square mile (2/km2). The racial makeup of the county was 94.64% White, 0.03% Black or African American, 0.49% Native American, 0.27% Asian, 3.79% from other races, and 0.79% from two or more races. 5.49% of the population were Hispanic or Latino of any race. 45.5% were of German, 10.4% Irish, 8.5% Swedish, 5.9% American, 5.9% Norwegian and 5.1% English.

There were 2,413 households, out of which 33.30% had children under the age of 18 living with them, 61.50% were married couples living together, 6.50% had a female householder with no husband present, and 29.30% were non-families. 25.90% of all households were made up of individuals, and 14.40% had someone living alone who was 65 years of age or older. The average household size was 2.58 and the average family size was 3.12.

The county population contained 27.50% under the age of 18, 7.10% from 18 to 24, 24.90% from 25 to 44, 22.40% from 45 to 64, and 18.20% who were 65 years of age or older. The median age was 39 years. For every 100 females, there were 98.50 males. For every 100 females age 18 and over, there were 94.50 males.

The median income for a household in the county was $34,201, and the median income for a family was $41,122. Males had a median income of $27,784 versus $20,573 for females. The per capita income for the county was $15,350.  About 7.50% of families and 10.00% of the population were below the poverty line, including 12.40% of those under age 18 and 9.00% of those age 65 or over.

Communities

Cities
 Ponca (county seat)
 Wakefield

Villages

 Allen
 Concord
 Dixon
 Emerson
 Martinsburg
 Maskell
 Newcastle
 Waterbury

Unincorporated communities
 Lime Grove

Townships

 Clark
 Concord
 Daily
 Emerson
 Galena
 Hooker
 Logan
 Newcastle
 Ottercreek
 Ponca
 Silvercreek
 Springbank
 Wakefield

Politics
Dixon County voters have been reliably Republican for decades. In only one national election since 1936 has the county selected the Democratic Party candidate, and that was the election of 1964, during Lyndon B. Johnson's landslide victory. However, he  narrowly won the county then.

See also
 National Register of Historic Places listings in Dixon County, Nebraska

References

 
Sioux City metropolitan area
Nebraska counties on the Missouri River
1858 establishments in Nebraska Territory
Populated places established in 1858